Udea endopyra is a moth of the family Crambidae. It is endemic to the Hawaiian islands of Oahu, Molokai, Maui and Hawaii.

The larvae feed on Rubus hawaiiensis. They roll the leaves of their host plant.

External links

Moths described in 1899
Endemic moths of Hawaii
endopyra